Forficula is a genus of earwigs in the family Forficulidae. The best known species is Forficula auricularia.

Species
The genus Forficula contains at least 68 species, making it the largest genus of earwigs. Some species are listed below:

 Forficula abrutiana
 Forficula aetolica
 Forficula auricularia
 Forficula apennina
 Forficula davidi
 Forficula decipiens
 Forficula greeni
 Forficula harberei
 Forficula iberica
 Forficula laeviforceps
 Forficula lesnei
 Forficula lucasi
 Forficula lurida
 Forficula mikado
 Forficula planicollis
 Forficula pubescens
 Forficula riffensis
 Forficula ruficollis
 Forficula scudderi
 Forficula silana
 Forficula smyrnensis
 Forficula tomis
 Forficula vicaria
 Forficula vilmi

References

External links
 
 

Dermaptera genera
Forficulidae
Insects described in 1758
Taxa named by Carl Linnaeus